Ralph Francis Julian Stonor, 5th Baron Camoys (26 January 1884 – 3 August 1968) was an English Aristocrat and Lord of Stonor Park who married an American heiress.

Early life
Lord Camoys was born on the 26 January 1884 at Stonor Park in Stonor, north of Henley-on-Thames in Oxfordshire, England.  He was the son of Francis Robert Stonor, 4th Baron Camoys (1856–1897) and the former Jessie Philippa Carew.  His father was the Lord-in-Waiting to Queen Victoria in 1886 and again from 1892–1895.

His paternal grandparents were Hon. Francis Stonor (second son of the Thomas Stonor, 3rd Baron Camoys) and Eliza Peel (a daughter of British prime minister Sir Robert Peel).  His maternal grandfather was Robert Russell Carew of Carew & Co., Ltd. and his maternal aunt, Katherine Jane Carew, was married to Edward Bosc Sladen, the British army officer.

Career
Upon his father's death in 1897, he succeeded as Baron Camoys and was thereafter known as Lord Camoys.

Lord Camoys identified himself with the pure food reform movement and was elected Chairman of the Executive Committee of the Pure Food and Health Society.  During World War II, he was also a Captain with the Buckinghamshire Home Guard from 1940 to 1945.

Personal life
On 25 November 1911, Ralph was married to American heiress, Mildred Constance Sherman (1888–1961), the daughter of William Watts Sherman and the former Sophia Augusta Brown, a granddaughter of the founder of Brown University in Providence, Rhode Island.  Together, they were the parents of the following children:

 Ralph Robert Watts Sherman Stonor (1913–1976), who succeeded his father to the barony. He married Jeanne Stourton (1913–1987), the third and youngest daughter of Captain Herbert Stourton, OBE (grandson of the 19th Baron Stourton), and his wife, Frances (daughter of the 4th Viscount Southwell).
 The Hon. Pamela Sophia Nadine Stonor (1917–2005) married Lt. Col. Charles Pepys, King's Own Yorkshire Light Infantry, a great-grandson of the 1st Earl of Cottenham, in 1941. They had no children.
 The Hon. Mildred Sophia Noreen Stonor (1922–2012) married John Rozet Drexel III (1919–2007) in 1941.  John was a great-grandson of Anthony Joseph Drexel.

Lord Camoys died at his American home, Stonor Lodge in Newport, Rhode Island (in the United States), on 3 August 1968.  At his death, he had seven grandsons and three great-grandchildren.

Descendants
Through his son, he was the grandfather of The Hon. Julia Camoys Stonor (b. 1939), who married Donald Saunders in 1963; Thomas Stonor, 7th Baron Camoys (1940−2023), who married who Elisabeth Hyde Parker in 1966; The Honourable Georgina Stonor (b. 1941); The Honourable Harriet Stonor (b. 1943), who married Julian Cotterell in 1965; and The Honourable John Stonor (1946—1994), who died unmarried.

Through his youngest daughter, he was the grandfather of Pamela Drexel; John Rozet Drexel IV, who married to Mary Jacqueline Astor, daughter of John Jacob Astor VI and Gertrude Gretsch; and Noreen Drexel O'Farrell.

References

External links

1884 births
1968 deaths
Stewards of Henley Royal Regatta
5
20th-century English nobility
British Home Guard officers